Ivan II Drašković (1550 – 1613) was a Croatian nobleman and politician from the Drašković noble family. He was Ban of Croatia from 1595 to 1606.

Biography
He was born as a son of Gašpar Drašković, from who he inherited the title of baron, and his wife Catherine Székely. Ivan Drašković married Hungarian Baroness Éva Istvánffy, daughter of Miklós Istvánffy. He is known as having defended Turopolje from the Ottoman Empire in 1570. He became Ban of Croatia in 1595. During his time in office, Drašković opposed Protestantism, which led to laws being brought which prohibited Protestants settling in Croatia.

Ivan Drašković renounced the office of Ban of Croatia during the Croatian Parliament session on 10 April 1606, but held the office until 1608. He was succeeded by Tamás Erdődy. His son and greatgrandson later became bans as well.

Legacy
He is notable for his strong support and advocacy of the 1607 founding of the Classical Gymnasium in Zagreb, which is the first and oldest currently operating institution of higher education in the city.

External links
Drašković family, barons created in 1569 and counts in 1631 (text in the Croatian Family Lexicon)
Ivan II Drašković, founder of the "Banal" branch of the family

References

Ivan
Bans of Croatia
1590s in Croatia
Masters of the treasury (Kingdom of Hungary)
Croatian nobility
Military commanders of Croatian kingdoms
Barons of Croatia
16th-century Croatian people
17th-century Croatian people
Habsburg Croats
16th-century Croatian nobility
17th-century Croatian nobility
1550 births
1613 deaths